Tung Chung is a station on the  of the MTR rapid transport system in Hong Kong. As the western end of the Tung Chung line, it is also a transfer point of those wishing to use the Ngong Ping Cable Car and by bus to the rest of Lantau Island. As with all other MTR stations, Tung Chung has a unique colour scheme used throughout the station, in this case lavender.

Given that the Tung Chung line and the Airport Express run largely parallel and share much trackage, and that most stations on Tung Chung line are interchange stations, Tung Chung is only one of two stations on the Tung Chung line not served by other lines, the other being .

Location
Tung Chung station is located in the new town of the same name on the northern shore of Lantau Island. The surrounding area is predominantly residential, with the majority of buildings in the station's catchment area being public and private housing blocks and schools. Exit C of the station leads to an open plaza which also provides access to a bus terminus and the nearby mall Citygate Outlets.

History
The contract to construct the station, valued at HK$1.1 billion, was awarded to Japanese construction company Aoki Corporation and commenced on 28 November 1994. The station was designed by Hong Kong architecture firm Rocco Design Architects and engineering company Ove Arup & Partners.

Site preparation began in early 1995. The station was officially topped out on 18 December 1996. A public open day was held on 12 June 1998.

The station opened with the rest of the new Tung Chung line on 22 June 1998. In December 2003, eight suspended sculptures were installed over the station concourse. Called Link, the artwork was designed by Hong Kong artist Freeman Lau, and alludes to the MTR's function in connecting urban dwellers to nature.

Layout
Both platforms share the same island platform underground. A "First Train" indicator is provided along the platform indicating to passengers which train to board.

Entrances/exits
The Tung Chung station concourse is located at ground level. It has four exits (two at each end of the concourse).

A: Tung Chung Crescent  (Red (Urban) taxi stand) 
Tung Chung Crescent (Block 1-3), Ching Chung Hau Po Woon Primary School, Fu Tung Estate, Fu Tung Plaza
B: Ngong Ping 360 
Tung Chung Cresent (Blocks 5-9), Citygate Outlets, Ngong Ping 360, Tung Chung Post Office
C: Citygate Outlets
D: Fu Tung Street (Lantau (Blue) taxi stand)

Transport connections

Taxis
An urban (red) taxi stand is located beside Exit A. A Lantau (blue) taxi stand at Exit D provides taxi services within Lantau Island.

Ngong Ping Cable Car
Opened on 18 September 2006, the MTR-owned Ngong Ping Cable Car connects Tung Chung with Ngong Ping, where the Po Lin Monastery and Tian Tan Buddha are located. The Tung Chung Cable Car Terminal is about 200 metres away from Exit B of Tung Chung station.

Buses
The station is served by a large number of bus routes which stop near the station and the Ngong Ping Cable Car terminus.

References

MTR stations in the New Territories
Railway stations in Hong Kong opened in 1998
Tung Chung line
Tung Chung